Armand Müller (26 July 1928 – 29 June 2014) was a Luxembourgian footballer. He played in four matches for the Luxembourg national football team from 1949 to 1951. He was also part of Luxembourg's team for their qualification matches for the 1954 FIFA World Cup.

References

External links
 

1928 births
2014 deaths
Luxembourgian footballers
Luxembourg international footballers
Place of birth missing
Association footballers not categorized by position